David Chung may refer to:

 David Chung (football executive) (born 1962), Malaysian-Papua New Guinean sports official and former footballer
 David Chung (golfer) (born 1990), Korean-American golfer
 David Chung (actor) (1946–2006), Korean-American actor
 David Chung (cinematographer) on An Autumn's Tale
 David Chung (artist) (born 1959), musician artist
 David Chung Wai-keung (born 1966), Hong Kong Under Secretary for Innovation and Technology